The Nowlands Creek, a watercourse of the Clarence River catchment, is located in the Northern Tablelands region in the state of New South Wales, Australia.

Location and features
The river flows generally northeast before reaching its confluence within the Sara River in remote country with the Nightcap Range. The river descends  over its  course.

See also

 Rivers of New South Wales
 List of rivers of New South Wales (L-Z)
 List of rivers of Australia

References

 

Northern Tablelands
Rivers of New South Wales
Armidale Regional Council